Alberto Barcel (1907–1975) was an Argentine actor. He appeared in more than 60 films between 1948 and 1966. He starred in the film Circe (1964), which was entered into the 14th Berlin International Film Festival.

Selected filmography
 Passport to Rio (1948)
 Dance of Fire (1949)
 The Marihuana Story (1950)
 El Vampiro negro (1953)
 The Black Market (1953)
 Alejandra (1956)
 Behind a Long Wall (1958)
 The Female: Seventy Times Seven (1962)
 Circe (1964)
 Así O De Otra Manera (1964)
 The Escaped (1964)
 Pajarito Gómez (1965)

External links
 

1907 births
1975 deaths
Argentine male film actors
20th-century Argentine male actors